Aclastus is a genus of wasps belonging to the family Ichneumonidae. The genus was described in 1868 by Förster and has cosmopolitan distribution.

Species 
 Aclastus gracilis (Thomson, 1884)
 Aclastus micator (Gravenhorst, 1807)

References

Ichneumonidae